John Valentine Clyne,  (February 14, 1902 – August 22, 1989) was a Canadian lawyer and former Justice of the British Columbia Supreme Court.

Born in Vancouver, British Columbia he attended the University of British Columbia and graduated in 1923. He was called to the British Columbia bar in 1927. He was appointed to the Supreme Court of British Columbia in 1950. In 1957 he was appointed a director of MacMillan Bloedel and later served as chairman and chief executive officer until his retirement in 1973. He was appointed Chancellor of the University of British Columbia in 1978 and served for six years. He was awarded an honorary degree from UBC in 1984.

In 1972 he was made a Companion of the Order of Canada.

References

External links
 John Valentine Clyne at The Canadian Encyclopedia

1902 births
1989 deaths
Businesspeople from Vancouver
Judges in British Columbia
Chancellors of the University of British Columbia
Companions of the Order of Canada
University of British Columbia alumni
20th-century Canadian lawyers
Peter A. Allard School of Law alumni
20th-century Canadian businesspeople